David Mbodj, known as Mbodj (born 15 September 1994) is a Senegalese football player who currently plays for the Lega Pro club F.C. Catania.

References

Senegalese footballers
1994 births
Living people
Association football defenders
Delfino Pescara 1936 players